Sodium 2-anthraquinonesulfonate (AMS) is a  water-soluble anthraquinone derivative. In the laboratory it could be prepared by sulfonation of anthraquinone.

Digester additive in papermaking
AMS is used as a catalyst in production of alkaline pulping in the soda process. It goes through a redox cycle similar to that of anthraquinone to give a catalytic effect. AMS was discovered as an efficient pulping catalyst before anthraquinone, but has a higher cost.

References

Anthraquinones
Sulfonates
Organic sodium salts